Chrome, Smoke & BBQ is a 4-CD box set by American rock band ZZ Top. Released in 2003, it is a compilation album of material from the band's tenures with London Records and Warner Bros. Records, recorded from 1967 to 1992. An abbreviated 2-CD version of this compilation, Rancho Texicano: The Very Best of ZZ Top (2004), was released the following year.

Release of Original Mixes 
At the time of its release in 2003, Chrome, Smoke & BBQ was noteworthy because it was the only CD release, except for the greatest hits album The Best of ZZ Top (1977/CD 1984), which used the original mixes of tracks from the band's first five studio albums. Other track or whole album CD releases for those five albums used remixed versions from 1987. (See The Six Pack box set.) These remixed versions displeased many fans because they significantly changed the sound from the original albums.

The Best of ZZ Top (1977) was first released on CD in 1984, and uses the original track mixes for the CD. It includes one track from ZZ Top's First Album, two from Rio Grande Mud, four from Tres Hombres and  three from Fandango!. Tres Hombres and Fandango! were reissued on CD in 2006, and were remastered using the original mixes. Chrome, Smoke & BBQ is the first ZZ Top track compilation release to include anything from the Tejas album.

In 2013, Warner Bros. Records released the CD box set The Complete Studio Albums 1970–1990, which includes the first ten ZZ Top studio albums, all with their original mixes. The timeframe of that ten album box set corresponds basically with the timeframe of Chrome, Smoke & BBQ; i.e., the London Records and Warner Bros. Records recording years.

Track listing 
All tracks are written by Billy Gibbons, Dusty Hill and Frank Beard, except where noted.

Personnel

ZZ Top 
 Billy Gibbons – guitar, vocals
 Dusty Hill - bass, keyboards, vocals
 Frank Beard - drums, percussion

Production and engineering 
 Steve Ames – Producer
 James Austin – Liner Notes, Compilation Producer
 Robin Brian – Engineer
 Neal Ceppos – Mixing
 Bert Frilot – Engineer
 Bill Ham – Producer, Executive Producer
 Joe Hardy – Engineer
 Doyle E. Jones – Engineer
 Terry Kane – Engineer
 Bob Ludwig – Engineer
 Terry Manning – Engineer
 Larry Nix – Engineer
 Jim Reeves – Engineer

Photography 
 Bob Alford – Photography
 Hugh Brown – Photography
 George Craig – Photography
 George DuBose – Photography
 Ross Halfin – Photography
 Mika Hashimoto – Photography
 Lee – Photography
 Dee Lippingwell – Photography
 Tony Mottram – Photography
 Bill Reitzel – Photography
 Bill Straus – Photography
 Jodi Summers – Photography
 Charlyn Zlotnik – Photography

Other 
 Farrah Fawcett – Quotes Researched & Compiled
 David Lynch – Quotes Researched & Compiled
 Bob Merlis – Interviewer
 Ann Richards – Quotes Researched & Compiled
 Kid Rock – Quotes Researched & Compiled
 Billy Bob Thornton – Quotes Researched & Compiled
 Tom Vickers – Liner Notes
 Dwight Yoakam – Quotes Researched & Compiled

References 

Albums produced by Bill Ham
ZZ Top compilation albums
2003 compilation albums
Warner Records compilation albums